Lukasz Sebastian Gottwald (born September 26, 1973), known professionally as Dr. Luke, Tyson Trax, and Made in China, is an American record producer and songwriter. His professional music career began in the late-night television sketch comedy Saturday Night Live as its house band's lead guitarist in 1997 and producing remixes for artists such as Bon Jovi and Gravediggaz. He came into music prominence in 2004 for producing Kelly Clarkson's single "Since U Been Gone" with Swedish record producer Max Martin.

Gottwald continued to co-write and produce commercially successful records such as "Who Knew" (2006) for Pink, "Girlfriend" (2007) for Avril Lavigne, and "I Kissed a Girl" (2008) for Katy Perry, before leaving Saturday Night Live and reuniting with Clarkson for "My Life Would Suck Without You" (2009). As the founder of Kemosabe Records, Gottwald has signed artists such as Kesha, Doja Cat, Juicy J, R. City, Lil Bibby, and Elliphant.

Gottwald's work has been recognized with various music industry awards. Billboard named him one of the top performing producers of the 2000s. The American Society of Composers, Authors and Publishers awarded him Producer and Songwriter of the Year honors from 2009 to 2011. At the 53rd Grammy Awards, he was nominated for a Grammy Award for Producer of the Year, Non-Classical, and Perry's Teenage Dream was nominated for Album of the Year.

In October 2014, Kesha initiated a series of lawsuits, alleging sexual assault and abuse by Gottwald.

Early life
Łukasz Sebastian Gottwald was born in Providence, Rhode Island. He is Jewish.  His father, Janusz Jerzy Gottwald, was an architect who was born in Łask, Poland. Gottwald spent many of his formative years in New York City. He had originally wanted to be a drummer, but his parents refused to allow a drum kit in the house. At 13, he picked up his older sister's guitar and taught himself how to play. As a teenager, Gottwald would "listen to bad music over and over, if there was a guitar part [he] admired, so [he] could figure out what the guitar player was doing right."

Career

Gottwald attended the Manhattan School of Music for two years. He joined the Saturday Night Live Band as the lead guitarist in 1997 until the 2006–2007 season.

He produced tracks and remixes for various artists including Arrested Development and Nappy Roots. He released the 12" single "Wet Lapse", under the name Kasz, for Rawkus Records, and remixed the theme from the film Mortal Kombat. While deejaying at a house party, Gottwald met producer Max Martin and subsequently gave Martin a tour of New York clubs when Martin arrived in the city.

Gottwald owns two publishing companies, Kasz Money Publishing, for his own songs, and Prescription Songs,  which employs other songwriters. As of January 2011, he has garnered 21 Top 40 Billboard Hot 100 singles, becoming the producer with the third most such hits since the charts were created.

He co-wrote and co-produced the Kelly Clarkson Hot 100 number two song, "Since U Been Gone" with Max Martin and provided the singer another hit in "Behind These Hazel Eyes". Subsequent songs by Pink, "Who Knew" and "U + Ur Hand" reached the Hot 100 top ten. He would go on to co-produce a number one for Avril Lavigne with the song "Girlfriend" as well as seven other songs on the Lavigne album. He also achieved a UK number one with the song "About You Now" for the Sugababes. Gottwald contributed two songs to Katy Perry's second album, One of the Boys. Hot 100 number one, "I Kissed a Girl" and "Hot n Cold", as well as three songs to Britney Spears' 2008 album, Circus, including the title track. He also co-produced the US number one song "Right Round" by Flo Rida. His third co-production for Kelly Clarkson, "My Life Would Suck Without You" reached the top of the Hot 100 as well. In late 2009, his song for Miley Cyrus, "Party in the U.S.A." co-written by Jessie J, reached number two on the chart. In December 2009, Billboard named him as one of the top 10 producers of the decade.

On April 21, Gottwald was named Songwriter of the Year at the 2010 ASCAP Pop Music Awards and received 10 ASCAP Pop Music Awards for the year as the songwriter and publisher. He had received ten Pop Music Awards from ASCAP between 2006 and 2009. He was also named to Fast Company's 100 Most Creative People in Business, placing at number 33. Gottwald's co-production for Katy Perry "California Gurls" debuted at number two on the Hot 100 and later reached number one. Second single "Teenage Dream" would follow suit. Taio Cruz's "Dynamite", co-produced by Gottwald, reached number one in the UK and number two in the US. He contributed to three more top ten songs, "Magic" for B.o.B, "My First Kiss" for 3OH!3, and "Take It Off" for Kesha, as well as a top five song, "Your Love Is My Drug", by the latter on the Hot 100.

In 2010 he was named both the Number One Hot 100 Songwriter of the Year and Number One Producer of the Year by Billboard. At the start of 2011, Advertising Age called Gottwald "the year's most successful producer and songwriter in terms of chart longevity."

On the week ending March 3, 2012, Gottwald's co-production for Katy Perry "Part of Me" became the 20th song to debut atop the Billboard Hot 100. He also produced Perry's single "Wide Awake", which peaked at number 2 on the Billboard Hot 100, whilst topping the US Pop Songs chart. On November 2, 2012, several songs from boy band One Direction's second album Take Me Home were leaked online, including "Rock Me", produced by Gottwald and frequent collaborators Cirkut, Emily Wright, and Kool Kojak.

, Luke was no longer listed on the official Sony Music website. Later that month, it was announced that Dr. Luke is no longer the CEO of Kemosabe Records. The same year Dr. Luke adopted the pseudonym Made in China. He has since produced songs for artists such as Trey Songz, Ne-Yo, and Big Boi.

In 2017, Luke began songwriting and producing for German singer-songwriter Kim Petras. He also produced five songs on Doja Cat's second album Hot Pink (2019), including its number one single "Say So". 

In 2021, Luke launched Amigo Records as an imprint of Republic Records and has so far signed Petras and Joy Oladokun.

Lawsuit with Kesha

In September 2013, Rebecca Pimmel, a fan of Kesha, set up a petition to "free" Kesha from Gottwald's management and accused Luke of "stunting" Kesha's creative growth as an artist. The petitioners concur with the position stated in Kesha's TV series documentary, My Crazy Beautiful Life, in which Luke serves as an executive producer, that she had little creative control of her second album, Warrior. In October 2014, Kesha sued Gottwald, claiming sexual assault and battery, sexual harassment, gender violence, civil harassment, violation of California's laws against unfair business practices, infliction of emotional distress (both intentional  and negligent), and negligent retention and supervision. Gottwald responded by filing a countersuit alleging that Kesha's lawsuit was an attempt by Kesha, her mother, and her new management firm to extort him into releasing her from her contract.

A preliminary injunction in which Kesha sought to be released from her contract was denied on February 19, 2016. Before her legal battle against Gottwald, in 2011, Kesha had previously sworn under oath that the producer had never assaulted or drugged her in a deposition for a lawsuit against her former managers at DAS Communications, a key piece of evidence that played a role in the court ruling in favor of the defense. In April 2016, Kesha claimed that she had been offered freedom from her contract if she recanted her rape allegations against Gottwald. Since Gottwald's countersuit was in New York, the court lacked jurisdiction to rule on incidents alleged to have occurred in California. Kesha filed suit in California, but a Los Angeles superior court judge froze Kesha's lawsuit until Gottwald's lawsuit, for breach of contract and defamation, was settled.

On April 6, 2016, New York Judge Shirley Kornreich dismissed Kesha's claims of sexual assault, sexual harassment, and gender violence. The judge dismissed Kesha's hate crime as well as the claim of intentional infliction of emotional distress. in March 2017, a judge refused to amend her original case, noting that Kesha had entered a contract after the time period that the singer alleges that abusive behavior began and contradicting the assertion that any alleged abuse would have been unforeseeable and suggesting that Dr. Luke's alleged abusive behavior would have been foreseeable.

In February 2020 a judge ruled that Kesha "made a false statement to Lady Gaga about Gottwald that was defamatory per se" and that "There is no evidence whatsoever that [Dr. Luke] raped Katy Perry."  The ruling stated that Kesha breached her contract with KMI, Dr. Luke’s record label, and as a result of that she is obligated to pay KMI "pre-judgment interest of $373,671.88."

Awards and nominations
Grammy Awards
2011 – Producer of the Year, Non-Classical (Nominated)
2011 – Album of the Year (Teenage Dream) (Nominated)
2014 – Song of the Year ("Roar") (Nominated)
2014 – Producer of the Year, Non-Classical (Nominated)
2021 – Record of the Year ("Say So") (Nominated)
2022 - Album of the Year (Planet Her (Deluxe)) (Nominated)

ASCAP Pop Music Awards
2010 – Songwriter of the Year (Won)
2011 – Songwriter of the Year (Won)

References

External links 
 
Dr. Luke Discography

1973 births
Living people
20th-century American guitarists
20th-century American singers
20th-century American male singers
21st-century American guitarists
21st-century American singers
21st-century American male singers
American male guitarists
American male pop singers
American male singer-songwriters
American people of Polish-Jewish descent
American pop guitarists
American synth-pop musicians
Guitarists from New York City
Guitarists from Rhode Island
Jewish American songwriters
Jewish singers
Manhattan School of Music alumni
Musicians from Providence, Rhode Island
Record producers from New York (state)
Record producers from Rhode Island
Remixers
Saturday Night Live Band members
Singers from New York City
Songwriters from Rhode Island
21st-century American Jews
Singer-songwriters from New York (state)